Naikap Naya Bhanjyang is a village and former Village Development Committee that is now part of Chandragiri Municipality in Kathmandu District in Province No. 3 of central Nepal. At the time of the 1991 Nepal census it had a population of 4,425.

References

Populated places in Kathmandu District